Ismael Valdéz Alvarez (formerly Valdes; born August 21, 1973) is a Mexican former professional baseball pitcher. During his major league career, he was nicknamed "The Rocket" in his native Mexico.

Career

Los Angeles Dodgers
Valdéz was 17 years old when he was signed by the Los Angeles Dodgers as an amateur free agent on June 14, 1991. He made his professional debut with the Gulf Coast Dodgers that year when he was 2-2 with a 2.32 ERA in 10 starts.

The Dodgers loaned him to the Mexico City Tigres in the Mexican League for the next two seasons before he returned to the U.S. to play in the Texas League for the San Antonio Missions in 1993. He won 16 games and lost 7 in Mexico, with 115 strikeouts. He won the Championship in 1992, with the Tigers. In 1994 he was promoted to the AAA Albuquerque Dukes in the Pacific Coast League.

Valdéz made his Major League debut on June 15, 1994 at the age of 20. He was the youngest player in the Majors at the time, pitching 2 shutout innings of relief against the Cincinnati Reds. His first win was recorded on July 5 against the Montreal Expos. He started for the first time in the Majors on July 18 against the New York Mets. However, he was taken out in the 2nd inning. In 21 games that season he was 3-1 with a 3.18 ERA.

In 1995, his first full major league season, Valdez had a record of 13–11 with 150 strikeouts and a 3.05 ERA. He was also third in the National League with 6 complete games. In 1996 he finished 3rd in the NL in winning percentage (.682) and held opponents to 2 or fewer runs in 19 of 33 starts. In 1999 he was 9-14 with a 3.98 ERA in 32 starts as the Dodgers did not give him any run support.

On August 27, 2000, Valdéz  was pitching for the Dodgers and was ejected from a game after he was accused of retaliating and throwing pitches at the head of Cubs first baseman Mark Grace.  The incident began in the top of the fifth inning when Cubs pitcher Kerry Wood yielded the second of two home runs to the Dodgers' Bruce Aven.  Wood then threw a pitch close to the next batter, Alex Cora, on the first pitch after Aven's second home run.  Wood denied that he was trying to hit Cora, but in the bottom of the fifth, Valdes came close to hitting Grace on the first pitch, drawing a warning from home plate umpire Mark Wegner.  Then, four pitches later, Valdéz hit Grace on the shoulder, and was ejected.  In September, Frank Robinson, major league baseball's head of on-field discipline, suspended Valdéz for six games and fined him $1,000 for the incident.  Valdes initially appealed, but several days later dropped his appeal and began serving his suspension.

In 185 games, 158 of which were starts, with the Dodgers from 1994–2000 he had a 61-57 record and 3.48 ERA with 784 strikeouts. He pitched in the 1995 and 1996 playoffs with the Dodgers.

Chicago Cubs
On December 12, 1999 the Dodgers traded him to the Chicago Cubs (along with Eric Young) for Terry Adams and two minor leaguers. In 12 starts for the Cubs in 2000 he was 2-4 with a 5.37 ERA. On June 26, 2000 he was traded back to the Dodgers for Jamie Arnold, Jorge Piedra and cash. He made 8 more starts for the Dodgers and was 0-3 with a 6.08 ERA.

Anaheim Angels
He signed as a free agent with the Anaheim Angels in 2001 and was 9-13 with a 4.45 ERA.

Texas Rangers
He signed with the Texas Rangers on January 28, 2002.

Seattle Mariners
The Rangers traded him to the Seattle Mariners on August 19, 2002 for Jermaine Clark and a minor leaguer. Valdez was 2-3 with a 4.93 ERA in 8 starts for the Mariners.

Back to Texas
Texas re-signed him as a free agent in the offseason. He was 14-17 with a 4.88 in 45 starts for the Rangers between 2002 and 2003.

San Diego Padres
He then signed as a free agent with the San Diego Padres on December 18, 2003. He was 9-6 with a 5.53 ERA in 23 appearances (20 starts) for the Padres and was traded to the Florida Marlins on July 31, 2004 in exchange for Travis Chick.

Florida Marlins
In 2 seasons with the Marlins he was 7-5 with a 4.89 ERA in 25 appearances (18 starts). He missed most of the 2005 season with a hairline fracture of his right fibula.

Mexico comeback
After many years away from the sport, Valdéz returned to organized baseball in 2013 as a member of the Tigres de Quintana Roo in the Mexican League.

Personal 
Prior to the 2004 season, Valdez used the spelling Valdes for his surname.

See also

 List of Major League Baseball players named in the Mitchell Report

References

External links

1973 births
Living people
Albuquerque Dukes players
Albuquerque Isotopes players
Anaheim Angels players
Baseball players from Tamaulipas
Chicago Cubs players
Daytona Cubs players
Florida Marlins players
Frisco RoughRiders players
Jupiter Hammerheads players
Los Angeles Dodgers players
Major League Baseball pitchers
Major League Baseball players from Mexico
Mexican expatriate baseball players in the United States
Mexican League baseball pitchers
People from Ciudad Victoria
San Antonio Missions players
San Diego Padres players
Seattle Mariners players
Texas Rangers players
Tigres de Quintana Roo players
Vero Beach Dodgers players